Birth control is a means of preventing pregnancy.

Birth control may also refer to:
Combined oral contraceptive pill, the oldest and most popular form of hormonal birth control
Birth Control (band), a German rock band
Birth Control (film)